Väsby hage Nature Reserve is a nature reserve in Stockholm County in Sweden.

The nature reserve lies on Munsö, not far from Munsö Church, and consists of an area of old cultural landscape with meadows, patches of forest and groves. Large contiguous pastures dominated by stands of solitary oaks characterise much of the reserve. It has a rich flora and is also an important habitat for both insects and birds. Birds found here include spotted nutcracker and hawfinch; plants include Polygala comosa, blue moor grass and adder's tongue. It is part of the Natura 2000-network.

References

External links

Nature reserves in Sweden
Natura 2000 in Sweden
Geography of Stockholm County
Tourist attractions in Stockholm County
Protected areas established in 1981
1981 establishments in Sweden